The 1931 Open Championship was the 66th Open Championship, held 3–5 June at Carnoustie Golf Links in Carnoustie, Angus, Scotland. Tommy Armour outlasted José Jurado by a single stroke to win his only Open title, and his third and final major championship. This was the first time Carnoustie hosted the championship.

Qualifying took place on 1–2 June, Monday and Tuesday, with 18 holes at Carnoustie and 18 holes at Panmure Golf Club in nearby  and the top 100 players and ties qualified. Macdonald Smith led the qualifiers on 141; the qualifying score was 160 and 109 players advanced. Prize money for the championship was increased to £500 with £100 for the champion, £75 for second place, £50 for third, £30 for fourth, £25 for fifth, £20 for sixth and seventh, £15 for eighth and ninth and £10 for the next 15 players.

Johnny Farrell, Henry Cotton, and Bill Twine led after the first round on Wednesday at even-par 72. Cotton shared the lead with Jurado after the second round at 147 (+3), with Armour a stroke behind. The top 60 and ties would make the cut; it was at 159 (+15)
and 66 players advanced to the final rounds.

Cotton slipped back with a 79 in the third round on Friday morning, while Jurado shot 73 to open up a three-shot lead over Smith and Arthur Havers. Farrell and Reg Whitcombe were a stroke back in a tie for fourth and Armour, Percy Alliss, and Gene Sarazen were tied for sixth. Despite a shaky finish which saw him take eleven strokes on the last two holes, Alliss shot 73 and took the clubhouse lead at 298. Armour surpassed that total after a course-record 71, finishing at 296. Still on the course when Armour finished, Jurado needed a 75 to win the title. After making the turn in 36, he found trouble on the back-nine. Jurado arrived at the 17th needing to finish with fives on the last two holes to tie Armour, but his drive found the burn and he carded a six.

Armour, age 36 and a U.S. citizen, played the Open Championship just once more; he returned to Britain to defend his title in 1932 and finished in 17th place.

Defending champion Bobby Jones won the amateur grand slam in 1930 at age 28 and retired from competition; he did not compete again at the Open.

Course

Championship Course

^ The 6th hole was renamed Hogan's Alley in 2003

Past champions in the field

Made the cut 

Source:

Missed the cut 

Source:

Did not advance past qualifying rounds (Monday & Tuesday):

Harry Vardon (1896, 1898, 1899, 1903, 1911, 1914) 163,James Braid (1901, 1905, 1906, 1908, 1910) 164, Sandy Herd (1902) 166.

Did not enter:
Bobby Jones (1926, 1927, 1930), Walter Hagen (1922, 1924, 1928, 1929),Jim Barnes (1925), Jock Hutchison (1921).

Round summaries

First round
Wednesday, 3 June 1931

Source:

Second round
Thursday, 4 June 1931

Source:

Third round
Friday, 5 June 1931 (morning)

Source:

Final round
Friday, 5 June 1931 (afternoon)

Source:

Amateurs: McRuvie (+24), L. Hartley (+25), Bookless (+31), Burge (+31),Sutton (+32), R. Hartley (+33), Shankland (+34), Tulloch (+34).

References

External links
Carnoustie (1931) (Official site)

The Open Championship
Golf tournaments in Scotland
Sport in Angus, Scotland
Open Championship
Open Championship
Open Championship